Florida Ruffin Ridley (born Florida Yates Ruffin; January 29, 1861 – February 25, 1943) was an African-American civil rights activist, suffragist, teacher, writer, and editor from Boston, Massachusetts. She was one of the first black public schoolteachers in Boston, and edited The Woman's Era, the country's first newspaper published by and for African-American women.

Early life and education

Florida Yates Ruffin was born on January 29, 1861, to a distinguished Boston family. Her father, George Lewis Ruffin, was the first African-American graduate of Harvard Law School and the first black judge in the United States. Her mother, Josephine St. Pierre Ruffin, was a noted African-American writer, civil rights leader, and suffragist. The family lived on Charles Street in the West End.

Ridley attended Boston public schools and graduated from Boston Teachers' College in 1882. She was the second African American to teach in the Boston public schools (the first was Elizabeth Smith, who taught at the Phillips School in the 1870s). She taught at the Grant School from 1880 until her marriage in 1888 to Ulysses Archibald Ridley, owner of a tailoring business in downtown Boston. The couple moved to Brookline, Massachusetts, in 1896, where they may have been the town's first African-American homeowners. Ridley was one of the founders of the Second Unitarian Church in Brookline. She and her husband had a daughter, Constance, and a son, Ulysses A. Ridley, Jr.

Activism

Following in her mother's footsteps, Ridley became politically active as a young woman. She was involved in the early women's suffrage movement and was an anti-lynching activist.

With her mother and Maria Louise Baldwin, Ridley co-founded several non-profit organizations. They founded the Woman's Era Club (later renamed the New Era Club), an advocacy group for black women, in 1894. In 1895 they founded a group that later became the National Association of Colored Women's Clubs. Speakers at their first meeting included the abolitionist and religious leader Eliza Ann Gardner, noted African-American scholar Anna J. Cooper, and Ella Smith, the first black woman to receive an M.A. from Wellesley College. In 1918, Ridley, Ruffin, and Baldwin founded the League of Women for Community Service. The League, which still exists today, provided social, educational, and charitable services for the black community. In 1923, Ridley conceived and directed an exhibit of "Negro Achievement and Abolition Memorials" at the Boston Public Library on behalf of the League.

Ridley, who had a special interest in black history, also co-founded the Society for the Collection of Negro Folklore in 1890, and founded the Society of the Descendants of Early New England Negroes in the 1920s.

Writing career

As a journalist and essayist, Ridley wrote mainly about black history and race relations in New England. She contributed to the Journal of Negro History, The Boston Globe, and other periodicals, and also published a number of short stories. She was a member of the Saturday Evening Quill Club, a literary group organized by Boston Post editor and columnist Eugene Gordon in 1925. Fellow members included Pauline Hopkins and Dorothy West. The Saturday Evening Quill, the group's annual journal, published the work of African-American women writers and artists, including Ridley, Helene Johnson, and Lois Mailou Jones.

Ridley also edited The Woman's Era, the country's first newspaper published by and for African-American women.

She died at her daughter's home in Toledo, Ohio, on February 25, 1943. Her home on Charles Street is a stop on the Boston Women's Heritage Trail.

Legacy 
Ridley is included in the 2019 anthology New Daughters of Africa, edited by Margaret Busby.

In September 2020, the Florida Ruffin Ridley School in Coolidge Corner, Brookline, Massachusetts, was renamed in her honor.

References

External links
 League of Women for Community Service

1861 births
1943 deaths
20th-century African-American women writers
20th-century American women writers
20th-century African-American writers
Activists for African-American civil rights
African-American history in Boston
African-American journalists
African-American suffragists
African-American women journalists
American suffragists
American women's rights activists
Burials at Mount Auburn Cemetery
Harlem Renaissance
People from the West End, Boston
Women civil rights activists
Writers from Boston